Brasamba! is an album by saxophonist Bud Shank, pianist Clare Fischer and guitarist Joe Pass released on the Pacific Jazz label.

Reception

AllMusic rated the album with 3 stars.

Track listing
All compositions by Clare Fischer, except as indicated
 "Brasamba" (Bud Shank) - 3:53
 "Ontem a Noite" - 4:14
 "Autumn Leaves" (Joseph Kosma, Jacques Prévert, Johnny Mercer) - 4:04
 "Sambinha" (Shank) - 3:38
 "Gostoso" - 3:55
 "If I Should Lose You" (Ralph Rainger, Leo Robin) - 2:57
 "Barquinho" (Roberto Menescal, Ronaldo Bôscoli) - 3:26
 "Serenidade" - 3:19
 "Elizete" - 4:16
 "Samba de Orfeu" (Luiz Bonfá, Antônio Maria) - 3:02

Personnel 
Bud Shank - alto saxophone, flute
Clare Fischer - piano
Joe Pass - guitar
Ralph Peña - bass
Larry Bunker - vibraphone, drums
Chuck Flores, Milt Holland - percussion

References 

1963 albums
Pacific Jazz Records albums
Bud Shank albums
Clare Fischer albums
Joe Pass albums